Ezra Foot (1809–1885) was a member of the Wisconsin State Senate.

Biography
Foot was born in Goshen, Connecticut in 1809. He married Clarissa Beach. Foot died in 1885.

Career
Foot was a member of the Senate representing the 17th district as a Republican from 1861 to 1862. Additionally, he founded Footville, Wisconsin and helped write the Constitution of Wisconsin.

References

People from Goshen, Connecticut
People from Rock County, Wisconsin
Republican Party Wisconsin state senators
1809 births
1885 deaths
19th-century American politicians